Reichenberg is a market town and municipality in the district of Würzburg in Bavaria in Germany. It consists of the villages Albertshausen, Fuchsstadt, Lindflur, Reichenberg and Uengershausen.

References

Würzburg (district)